Yannick Mireur (born 1971) is a French political scientist and author specializing in American affairs and U.S. foreign policy. and the founder of Nexus forum, an independent organization that holds events and roundtables on the urban digital and energy transition.

Formerly with Cambridge Energy Research Associates, an energy consultancy where he worked on European gas matters, he later directed a Paris-based, independent think tank and publication center, Institut Choiseul, where he founded Politique Américaine, the French leading quarterly journal on US affairs with a board of US policymakers and scholars such as Joseph Bye, Francis Fukuyama, James Schlesinger and many others. Mireur was chief editor of the journal between 2004 and 2011. He is also the author of two books on American politics and society (see below After Bush: Why America Will Not Change and Obama's World).

Education
A graduate of Institut d'Études Politiques de Paris, Yannick Mireur earned an MA and a PhD from the Fletcher School of Law and Diplomacy at Tufts University in Boston where he was awarded a Fulbright Program scholarship. He has taught at the French Military Academy of Saint-Cyr and is a frequent guest of leading French networks and stations to comment on US and international affairs.

Writings
Under press in August 2008, as Barack Obama had not yet won the Democratic presidential nomination, Après Bush went against the mainstream arguing that the strength of American Conservatism would survive the presidency of George W. Bush. While the book reckoned that America needed to reinvent a social contract and a global leadership, it also argued that the lasting hey-day of Liberalism since FDR had been followed by a Conservative cycle that was still running its course, as the later emergence of the Tea Party movement would show. However corroded, the post-Bush Conservative movement was still a powerful one in American politics. Reminding the reader of Arthur Schlesinger’s cycles of American history, the book analyzes the sources of America's various political currents and their legacies. In his foreword, former French Foreign Minister Hubert Védrine wrote: “After Bush undertakes the more ambitious task of reconstituting the richness and complexity of these issues and events in American history and in deeper American political ideals.”

Published three years later, Le Monde d’Obama largely centers on the China-US relationship and international affairs. Half way into the Obama presidency, the book argues that the main force in international politics in the 21st century is the rise of individual aspirations and the desire for breathing space by populations suffocating under authoritarian rule, as the so-called "Arab spring" illustrated.

Both books go at length explaining American political progressivism and how it infused Obama’s political thinking, In both books the author argues that America needs to reinvent a progressist project to revive her self-confidence and restore her world leadership. Just like FDR did with his New Deal, forging a new relationship between the state and the market, and with the expansion of American leadership. Just like TR had done before FDR with his Square Deal and a measured, if assertive “speak softly but carry a big stick” approach to rising US power.

Mireur has given numerous lectures in the US (Center for Strategic and International Studies, University of Minnesota in Minneapolis, University of Columbia, University of Ottawa, California Technology Institute, etc.), and has contributed editorials to the French business daily Les Échos (France). He is a registered contributor to the newspaper’s online platform Les Cercle Les Echos. He is a regular guest of French TV and radio media outlets and appeared on CNN as guest of Christiane Amanpour.

His latest book, Hausser le ton! (Raising your voice), published in 2014, addressed French politics. Pointing out to a general climate of moral apathy, the book called for raising the general level of the public debate in France and for abandoning the coded political language that loses people and makes them angry, exacerbating the malaise generated by globalization. The book offers a historical comparison of the key political and policy issues that have riled the French public debate in the 1930s, the 1970s and the 2010s, addressing the issues of leadership, social and class struggle, political institutions and the French elite system. The chapter called "Urbanity" examines the role of aesthetics in politics, and how architecture is an integral part of political action, arguing that ambitious urban policies would greatly contribute to restore the social fabric.

From calling the general status of civil servants outdated to asserting the importance of an assertive European Project in the midst of growing euroskepticism, the book addressed issues that continue to remain center-stage in French politics.

Publications
 "Immigration et combativité commerciale, piliers du succès politique de Trump"
 "Trump, une mauvaise méthode pour servir une juste cause" 
 "Face à la Chine, Trump est un idiot utile dont l'imprévisibilité et la démence servent les intérêts américains" , Le Monde, 15 December 2017
 "14-Juillet: oui, il fallait inviter Trump"14-Juillet: oui il fallait inviter Trump, Journal du Dimanche, 14 July 2017
 "Et si Trump avait raison en se réclamant du patriotisme économique?" 
 "Obama et le mirage africain" Obama et le mirage africain
 "La société russe n'a plus confiance en l'Occident" La société russe n'a plus confiance en l'Occident, Le Monde, 10 April 2014
 "Une lente libéralisation du crédit en Chine"Une lente libéralisation du crédit en Chine, Le Monde, 25 November 2013
 "Hausser le ton!", Apopsix Editions, Paris, 2014
 Le Monde d’Obama, Choiseul Editions, Paris, 2011
 Après Bush - Pourquoi l'Amérique ne changera pas, Choiseul Editions, Paris, 2008
 «La Réinvention de l'Amérique», Les Échos, Paris, 2 juin 2008 
 «États-Unis/Politique étrangère» dans Ramses 2011, IFRI, Paris, 2010
 «États-Unis/Politique étrangère» dans Ramses 2010, IFRI, Paris, 2009
 «États-Unis/Politique étrangère» dans Ramses 2009, IFRI, Paris, 2008
 «Vive le néoconservatisme» The National Interest, Sept. – Oct. Issue, 2006, Washington DC 
 «En finir avec l'anti-américanisme» dans Géoéconomie, n° 40, Choiseul Editions, Paris, 2007
 «La politique globale des Etats-Unis et la sauvegarde du modèle américain » dans Politique américaine, n° 3, Choiseul Editions, Paris, 2006
 «De Wilson à Bush, l'Amérique à l'heure des choix», Politique Américaine, n° 1, Choiseul Editions, Paris, 2005
 «Corée du Sud: un nouveau grand?» dans Géoéconomie, n° 34, Choiseul Editions, Paris, 2005
 «L'Italie et l'Europe: enjeux et prospective» dans Géoéconomie, no 29, Choiseul Editions, Paris, 2004

References

French political scientists
Living people
1971 births
French male non-fiction writers
Date of birth missing (living people)